Mao Anqing (23 November 1924 – 23 March 2007) was the last surviving son of Mao Zedong, Chairman of the Chinese Communist Party. He was the second son of Mao and his wife, Yang Kaihui. He had a mental illness, possibly schizophrenia. He worked as a translator and never became active in politics.

Early life 
Mao Anqing was born at Central South University Xiangya Hospital in Changsha, in Hunan province. His mother was executed by the local warlord, He Jian, in 1930. Mao Anqing, his elder brother Mao Anying and his younger brother Mao Anlong escaped to Shanghai. Their father was in Jiangxi province at the time, and they were looked after by local communist activists. They spent some time living on the streets, and Mao Anqing was badly beaten by a policeman in 1930. Some blame this beating for his later mental illness. His younger brother Mao Anlong died in Shanghai.

Mao and his surviving elder brother were sent to Paris in 1936, and then moved to Moscow, where they remained until 1947. Mao Anqing and his brother participated in World War II for the Soviet Union against Nazi Germany.

Later life 
Mao returned to China with his brother in 1947 and joined the Chinese Communist Party (CCP). The Communist forces under his father defeated the opposing Kuomintang forces on mainland China in 1949, and proclaimed the People's Republic of China. His brother was killed in 1950 in Korea, and Mao Anqing's mental illness worsened. He spent considerable periods in mental hospitals.

Mao Anqing worked as a researcher at the Academy of Military Sciences and the Publicity Department of the CCP Central Committee, mainly translating books from Russian to Chinese as a Russian linguist. He also wrote various books on his father. He was never actively involved in politics.

Personal life 
He married Shao Hua in September 1960. She later became a major general in the People's Liberation Army, and a member of the committee of the Chinese People's Political Consultative Conference. Together, they had one child, Mao Xinyu, who was born in 1970. They are the only known remaining male line descendants of Mao Zedong. Shao Hua died on 24 June 2008, In People's Liberation Army Hospital in Beijing, in the age of 69.

When Mao Anqing died in 2007, he was the last of Mao Zedong's known surviving sons.

References

External links 
 Mao's second son dies, Xinhua, 24 March 2007 
 Obituary, The Independent, 27 March 2007
 Obituary, The Times, 28 March 2007

1924 births
2007 deaths
Chinese people of World War II
Children of national leaders of China
Mao Zedong family
Russian–Chinese translators
People's Republic of China translators
Writers from Changsha
20th-century Chinese translators
21st-century Chinese translators